Dragiša (Cyrillic: Драгиша) is a version of the masculine given name Drago, and may refer to:

Dragiša Binić (born 1961), Serbian footballer
Dragiša Brašovan (1887–1965), Serbian modernist architect
Dragiša Burzan (born 1950), Serbia and Montenegro ambassador to London since 2004
Dragiša Cvetković (1893–1969), Yugoslav politician
Dragiša Drobnjak (born 1977), Slovenian professional basketball player
Dragiša Lapčević (1867–1939), Serbian politician
Dragiša Pejović (born 1982), Serbian Football player
Dragiša Pešić (born 1954), politician from Montenegro
Dragiša Stanisavljević (born 1921), Serbian naive art sculptor
Dragiša Vasić (1885–1945), Serbian lawyer and writer
Dragiša Žunić (born 1978), Serbian footballer

See also
Drago (disambiguation)

Slavic masculine given names
Serbian masculine given names